Behrensdorf is a municipality in the district of Plön, in Schleswig-Holstein, Germany. It lies on the western shore of Hohwacht Bay on the Baltic Sea coast. About one kilometre to the north is the eighty-year-old Neuland Lighthouse.

References

Municipalities in Schleswig-Holstein
Plön (district)